Rond den Heerd ("Around the Hearth") was a weekly Dutch-language family magazine published in Bruges (Belgium) from 1865 to 1890. It was founded by Guido Gezelle and William Henry James Weale. From 1870 the main editor was Adolf Duclos. Editorial disagreements led to the founding of the alternative Biekorf in 1890. Weekly publication of Rond den Heerd ceased, but Duclos continued to produce occasional publications under the title until 1902.

Back issues were reprinted in 1988-1989.

References

External links
Rond den Heerd on the Digital Library for Dutch Literature.
Rond den Heerd, vol. 7 (1871) on Google Books.

Defunct magazines published in Belgium
Dutch-language magazines
Magazines established in 1865
Magazines disestablished in 1890
Magazines published in Flanders
Parenting magazines
Weekly magazines published in Belgium